Mohammad Shadab Kabir Siddiqi (born 12 November 1977) is a Pakistani cricketer who played in five Test matches and three One Day Internationals from 1996 to 2002.

References

1977 births
Living people
Pakistan Test cricketers
Pakistan One Day International cricketers
Pakistani cricketers
Karachi cricketers
Karachi Blues cricketers
Karachi Whites cricketers
Pakistan National Shipping Corporation cricketers
Redco Pakistan Limited cricketers
Pakistan Customs cricketers
Karachi Port Trust cricketers
Karachi Urban cricketers
Port Qasim Authority cricketers
Karachi Zebras cricketers
Karachi Dolphins cricketers
Cricketers from Karachi